The 2022–23 season is the 124th season in the history of TSG 1899 Hoffenheim and their 15th consecutive season in the top flight. The club are participating in the Bundesliga and the DFB-Pokal. The season covers the period from 1 July 2022 to 30 June 2023.

Players

Players out on loan

Transfers

Transfers in

Transfers out

Pre-season and friendlies

Competitions

Overall record

Bundesliga

League table

Results summary

Results by round

Matches 
The league fixtures were announced on 17 June 2022.

DFB-Pokal

Statistics

Appearances and goals

|-
! colspan=14 style=background:#dcdcdc; text-align:center| Goalkeepers

|-
! colspan=14 style=background:#dcdcdc; text-align:center| Defenders 

 

 

 

|-
! colspan=14 style=background:#dcdcdc; text-align:center| Midfielders 

 
 

 

 
 
|-
! colspan=14 style=background:#dcdcdc; text-align:center| Forwards 

 

 
 
 
|-
! colspan=14 style=background:#dcdcdc; text-align:center| Players transferred out during the season 

 
 
 

|-

Goalscorers

Last updated: 11 February 2023

References

TSG 1899 Hoffenheim seasons
Hoffenheim